Kęstutis Šeštokas (born April 15, 1976) is a Lithuanian professional basketball player, who plays at the power forward position. He last played for Molėtai Ežerūnas-Karys basketball team. He is the only player who has won the domestic leagues (LKL, LBL, KML) of all three Baltic states. His major trophies include the Euroleague title in 1999, the ULEB Cup title in 2005 and the Saporta Cup in 1998 as well as many regional and domestic titles.

Achievements

National Team
 1994 European U-18 Champion
 1996 European U-20 Champion
 1997 member of the Lithuanian squad at EuroBasket 1997

Club
 1993–94  Lithuanian League Championship (Žalgiris Kaunas)
 1994–95  Lithuanian League Championship (Žalgiris Kaunas)
 1995–96  Lithuanian League Championship (Žalgiris Kaunas)
 1996–97  Lithuanian League Championship (Žalgiris Kaunas)
 1997–98  EuroCup Championship (Žalgiris Kaunas)
 1997–98  Baltic Cup Championship (Žalgiris Kaunas)
 1997–98  Lithuanian League Championship (Žalgiris Kaunas)
 1998–99  Euroleague Championship (Žalgiris Kaunas)
 1998–99  NEBL Championship (Žalgiris Kaunas)
 1998–99  Lithuanian League Championship (Žalgiris Kaunas)
 2001–02  NEBL Championship (Lietuvos Rytas Vilnius)
 2001–02  Lithuanian League Championship (Lietuvos Rytas Vilnius)
 2003–04  Latvian League Championship (BK Ventspils)
 2004–05  ULEB Cup Championship (Lietuvos Rytas Vilnius)
 2004–05  Latvian League Championship (BK Ventspils)
 2005–06  Cypriot League Championship (AEL Limassol)
 2007–08  Estonian League Championship (Tartu Ülikool/Rock)
 2008–09  NKL Championship (Rudupis Prienai)
 2010–11  RKL Championship (Molėtai Ežerūnas-Karys)

References

External links
 Profile at basketpedya.com

1976 births
Living people
AEL Limassol B.C. players
BC Khimik players
BC Žalgiris players
BC Rytas players
Lithuanian expatriate basketball people in Estonia
Lithuanian men's basketball players
Power forwards (basketball)
Tartu Ülikool/Rock players
UB La Palma players
Basketball players from Kaunas